Ziade or Ziadé, and its common variants Ziadah, Ziadeh, Ziyadeh, Zyade and Zyadeh, is an Arabic surname that means "increase, overabundance, plus, addition or surplus". It is rooted in the Arabic word of the same meaning Zayd.
It may refer to:

People
 Ignace Ziadé (1906–1994), Lebanese Christian cleric, an Archbishop of the Maronite Catholic Church 
 Lamia Ziadé (born 1968), Lebanese illustrator and visual artist
 May Ziadeh (also Mayy Ziyādah; 1886–1941), Lebanese-Palestinian poet, essayist and translator
 Philippe Ziade (journalist) (1909–2005), Lebanese journalist 
 Philippe Ziade (businessman) (born 1976), Lebanese-American entrepreneur

Other uses
Zadeh, a suffix used in many Persian names
Ziade Palace, a 19th-century grand mansion located in Zokak el-Blat quarter, Beirut, Lebanon

See also 
 Ziadie family